Based on the numbers of adherents, the Eastern Orthodox Church (also known as Eastern Orthodoxy) is the second largest Christian communion in the world, after the Roman Catholic Church, with the most common estimates of baptised members being approximately 220 million. The numerous Protestant groups in the world, if taken all together, substantially outnumber the Eastern Orthodox, but they differ theologically and do not form a single communion.

Overview
Eastern Orthodoxy is the predominant religion in Russia (77%), where roughly half the world's Eastern Orthodox Christians live. The religion is also heavily concentrated in the rest of Eastern Europe, where it is the majority religion in Ukraine (65.4%–77%), Romania (82%), Belarus (48%–73%), Greece (95%–98%), Serbia (97%), Bulgaria (88%), Moldova (93%), Georgia (84%), North Macedonia (65%), Cyprus (89%) and Montenegro (72%); it is also predominant in the disputed territories of Abkhazia, South Ossetia and Transnistria.

Significant minorities are present in several European countries: Bosnia and Herzegovina (31%), Latvia (18%), Estonia (14%), Albania (7%), Lithuania (4%), Croatia (4%), Slovenia (2%), and Finland (1.5%). In the former Soviet republics of Central Asia,  Eastern Orthodoxy constitutes the dominant religion in northern Kazakhstan, representing 23.9% of the population of the region, and is also a significant minority in Kyrgyzstan (17%), Turkmenistan (5%), Uzbekistan (5%), Azerbaijan (2%), and Tajikistan (1%). In the Middle East, the most significant Eastern Orthodox populations are in Lebanon (8%), Syria (5–8% prior to the 2011 civil war) in Palestine (0.5%–2.5%) and Jordan (over 1%).

The percentage of Christians in Turkey, home to an historically large and influential Eastern Orthodox community, fell from 19% in 1914 to 2.5% in 1927, due to genocide, demographic upheavals caused by the population exchange between Greece and Turkey, and the emigration of Christians to foreign countries (mostly in Europe and the Americas). Today there are more than 160,000 people of different Christian denominations.

Recent immigration and missionary activity have raised the numbers of Eastern Orthodox adherents in traditionally Catholic and Protestant countries, including Australia, Austria, Germany, Italy, Spain, Canada and Switzerland, where they comprise roughly 2% of the population in each.

Eastern Orthodox population by country

The number of members of the Eastern Orthodox Church in each country has been subject to debate.

Each study performed that seeks to discover the number of adherents in a country may use different criteria, and be submitted to different populations. As such, some numbers may be inflated, and therefore inaccurate. Examples of this are Greece and Russia, where estimates of adherence to Eastern Orthodoxy may reach 80–98%, but where surveys found lower percentages professing Eastern Orthodoxy or belief in God. The likely reason for this disparity is that many people in majority Eastern Orthodox countries will culturally identify with the Eastern Orthodox Church, especially if they were baptized as children, even if they are not currently practicing. This includes those who may be irreligious, yet culturally identify with the Eastern Orthodox Church, or for whom Eastern Orthodox Christianity is listed on official state records. Other cases of incongruent data also might be due to counting ethnic groups from Eastern Orthodox countries rather than actual adherents. For example, the Eastern Orthodox jurisdictions in the United States, which has large numbers of immigrants from Eastern Orthodox countries, have collectively reported a total of 2–3 million across the country.

However, a 2010 study by Alexei Krindatch sought data from each parish, with the specific criteria of annual participation, discovering that there were only about 817,000 Eastern Orthodox Christians actively practicing their faith (i.e., attending church services on a regular basis) in the United States. The study explained that such a difference was due to a variety of circumstances, for example the higher numbers having counted all people who self-identify as Eastern Orthodox on a census regardless of active participation, or all people belonging to ethnic groups originating in Eastern Orthodox countries. This study, while initially controversial, proved groundbreaking, and has since been officially approved for use by the Assembly of Canonical Orthodox Bishops of the United States of America.

Eastern Orthodox Church by jurisdiction

Autocephalous Eastern Orthodox Churches
The Eastern Orthodox Church is organized as a union of several autocephalous subdivisions, which are also called "Churches" (or, sometimes, "jurisdictions"). Some are associated with a specific country, while others are not. This table presents some known data regarding individual jurisdictions. "NA" means that data is not available.

Notes

References

 
Eastern Orthodoxy in Europe
History of Eastern Orthodoxy
Christianity in the Middle East